The Australia men's national wheelchair basketball team is the men's wheelchair basketball side that represents Australia in international competitions. The team is known as the Rollers. Australia took the gold medal at the 1996 Atlanta Paralympic Games and 2008 Beijing Paralympic Games.

Australia has competed at every men's wheelchair basketball tournament at the Paralympic Games except 1964. Kevin Coombs was Australia's first captain of the men's wheelchair basketball team.

The Rollers qualified for the 2016 Summer Paralympics by winning the 2015 Asia Oceania Qualifying Tournament and finished sixth.

Competitions

Summer Paralympics

Performance in Gold Cup / World Championships
1973 – did not participate
1975 – did not participate
1979 – did not participate
1983 – 11th
1986 – 10th
1990 – 6th 
1994 – 6th
1998 – 4th
2002 – 4th
2006 –  Bronze
2010 –  Gold
2014 –  Gold
2018 –  Bronze

Past Paralympic Games Rosters

1960 Summer Paralympics
 
Team members –  Men – John Turich (captain), Roger Cockerill, Kevin Coombs, Chris O'Brien, Kevin Cunningham, Gary Hooper, Bill Mather-Brown, Bruno Moretti, Frank Ponta
Results included: Israel d Australia 22–5 ; Australia d Belgium 26–0 ; United States d Australia 32–10. Results may be incomplete.

1964 Summer Paralympics
Australia did not field a team at the 1964 Summer Paralympics.

1968 Summer Paralympics
 Finished 9th among 13 teams.
Team members – Kevin Bawden, Peter Burt, Brian Chambers, Kevin Cunningham, Kevin Coombs, Bill Mather-Brown, John Martin, Robert McIntyre, Bruno Moretti, Frank Ponta, Noel Simmons, Dom Watts

1972 Summer Paralympics
Finished 8th among 9 teams.
In the preliminary rounds, Australian results were: United States 85 v Australia 29; Israel 101 v Australia 36; France 74 v Australia 53. Australia finished 8th in the tournament.
Team members – Brian Chambers, Kevin Coombs, Terry Giddy, John Martin, Robert McIntyre, Hugh Patterson, Frank Ponta, Victor Salvemini

1976 Summer Paralympics
Finished'' 10th among 21 teams 
Australian results: Sweden 79 v Australia 51, Belgium 43 v Australia 30, United States 93 v Australia 34, Australia 57 v Japan 42. Australia did not qualify for the finals.Team members – Kevin Bawden, John Kidd, Stan Kosmala, Ray Letheby, John Martin, Robert McIntyre, Richard Oliver, Frank Ponta, Eric Russell, Victor Salvemini Coach – Les Mathews.

1980 Summer ParalympicsFinished 13th among 17 teams Team members – Rene Ahrens, Robert Augustine, Kevin Bishop, Peter Burt, Kevin Coombs, Len Ettridge, Erich Hubel, Robert McIntyre, Brian McNicholl, Kevin Munro, Richard Oliver, Fred Pointer

1984 Summer ParalympicsFinished 11th among 18 teams 
Team members – Michael Callahan, Kevin Coombs, David Gould, Erich Hubel, Ch. Ikstrum, Michael McFawn, Nick Morozoff, Richard Oliver, P. Peterson, M. Pope ; Coach – Bruno Moretti

1988 Summer ParalympicsFinished 10th among 17 teams Team members – Troy Andrews, Sandy Blythe, Stuart Ewin, David Gould, Michael Haughey, Gerry Hewson, Erich Hubel, Michael McFawn, Richard Oliver, Christopher Sparks, Stephen Trestrail, Michael Walker

1992 Summer ParalympicsFinished 9th among 12 teams Team members – Troy Andrews, Sandy Blythe, Michael Callahan, Stuart Ewin, David Gould, Gerry Hewson, Errol Hyde, Timothy Maloney, Richard Oliver, Troy Sachs, Stephen Trestrail, Michael Walker ; Coach – Michael Tucker  Official – Graham Gould (escort)

1996 Summer ParalympicsFinished 1st among 12 teams. The team beat Great Britain for the gold medal with a final score of 78:63.   
 Team members –  Troy Andrews, Sandy Blythe, Orfeo Cecconato, Ben Cox, Stuart Ewin, David Gould, Gerard Hewson, Timothy Maloney, Nicholas Morris, Richard Oliver, David Selby, Troy Sachs ; Coaches  Mark Walker (head coach), Evan Bennett (assistant coach) Graham Gould (Mechanic/Operations) 
Detailed Results – Wheelchair basketball at the 1996 Summer Paralympics – Men

2000 Summer ParalympicsFinished 5th among 12 teams Team members – Troy Andrews, Sandy Blythe, David Gould, Shaun Groenewegen, Gerry Hewson, Adrian King, Michael McFawn, Nick Morris, Brad Ness, Shane Porter, Brook Quinn, Troy Sachs Coaches – Bob Turner (Head), Michael Walker, Richard Oliver Officials – Fred Heidt (manager), John Camens, Graham Gould 
Detailed Results – Wheelchair basketball at the 2000 Summer Paralympics – Men

2004 Summer Paralympics Finished 2nd among 12 teams.
The Australian's were beaten by Canada 53:70 in the Gold Medal match.
 Team members – David Selby, Grant Mizens, Campbell Message, Brendan Dowler, Brad Ness, Adrian King, Daryl Taylor, Andrew Flavel, Shaun Norris, Tristan Knowles, Troy Sachs, Justin Eveson ; Coaches – Bernard Treseder (Head), Alan Cox (Assistant), Craig Friday (Assistant Technical) ; Officials – Kelvin Browner (manager)Results – ATHENS 2004 Paralympic Games – Wheelchair Basketball – Men, International Paralympic Committee (IPC) 
Detailed Results – Wheelchair basketball at the 2004 Summer Paralympics – Men

2008 Summer Paralympics Finished 1st among 12 teams.
The team beat Canada 72:60 in the FinalTeam members – Justin Eveson, Tige Simmons, Grant Mizens, Michael Hartnett, Brendan Dowler, Dylan Alcott, Adrian King, Brett Stibners, Tristan Knowles, Troy Sachs, Shaun Norris, Brad Ness ; Coaches- – Ben Ettridge, Craig Friday (Assistant) ; Officials – Kevin Browner (Section Manager), Ian Lowther (physiotherapist)Results – Beijing 2008 Paralympic Games – Wheelchair Basketball – Men, International Paralympic Committee (IPC) 
Detailed Results – Wheelchair basketball at the 2008 Summer Paralympics – Men

2012 Summer Paralympics Finished 2nd among 12 teams.
The team was defeated by Canada 58:64 in the Gold Medal match.Team members – Justin Eveson (4.5), Bill Latham (4.0), Brett Stibners (4.0), Shaun Norris (3.0), Michael Hartnett (1.0), Tristan Knowles (4.0), Jannik Blair (1.0), Tige Simmons (1.0), *Grant Mizens (2.0), Dylan Alcott (1.0), Nick Taylor (2.0), Brad Ness (4.5) ; Coaches – Ben Ettridge (head coach), Matteo Feriani (assistant coach), Tom Kyle (assistant coach) 
Detailed Results – Wheelchair basketball at the 2012 Summer Paralympics – Men

2016 Summer Paralympics Finished 6th among 12 teams.
 Team members - Josh Allison (d), Jannik Blair, Adam Deans (d), Tristan Knowles, Bill Latham, Matthew McShane (d), Brad Ness, Shaun Norris, Tom O'Neill-Thorne (d), Shawn Russell (d), Tige Simmons, Brett Stibners ; Coaches – Ben Ettridge (head coach), Luke Brennan (Assistant), Tom Kyle (assistant coach), Jeremy Synot (video coach) ; Program Manager – Leigh Gooding ; Health Coordinator & Team Physiotherapist – Jesse Adams 
Detailed Results – Wheelchair basketball at the 2016 Summer Paralympics

2020 Summer Paralympics Finished 5th among 12 teams.
 Team members - Michael Auprince, Jannik Blair, Tristan Knowles, Bill Latham, Matthew McShane, John McPhail (d), Shaun Norris, Tom O'Neill-Thorne, Kim Robins (d), Brett Stibners, Jeremy Tyndall (d), Samuel White (d) Coaches – Craig Friday (head coach), Grant Mizens (Assistant), Brad Ness (assistant coach), Shane Furness (Assistant) ; Program Manager – Leigh Gooding ; Team Manager - Priyanka Karunakaran ; Physiotherapist - Ryan Campbell 
Detailed Results – Wheelchair basketball at the 2020 Summer Paralympics

(d) Paralympic Games debut 

Past Gold Cup / World Championships Games Rosters
World Championships from 1973 to 2002 known as Gold Cup.

1983 Gold CupFinished 11thTeam members – Kevin Bishop, Ron Burgers, Michael Callahan, Kevin Coombs (Capt.), Erich Hubel, Errol Hyde, Charles Ikstrums, Robert MacIntyre, Michel McFawn, Richard Oliver, Peter Petersen, Mark Pope ; Coaches – Bruno Moretti (head coach), Charles Ryan (assistant coach)

1986 Gold CupFinished 10thTeam members – Kevin Bishop, Michael Callahan, David Gould, Erich Hubel, Errol Hyde, Eric Klein, Michael McFawn, Robert McIntyre, Michael Nugent, Richard Oliver, Chris Sparks, Steven Trestrail ; Coaches – Charles Ryan (head coach), Kevin Bawden (assistant coach)

1990 Gold CupFinished 5thTeam members – Troy Andrews, Sandy Blythe, Michael Callahan, Stewart Ewin, David Gould, Gerry Hewson, Steve Lazarakes, Tim Maloney, Richard Oliver, Chris Sparks, Paul Stitt, Michael Walker ; Coach – Michael Tucker

1994 Gold CupFinished 6thTeam members –  Troy Andrews, Sandy Blythe, Orfeo Cecconato, Michael McFawn, David Gould, Gerry Hewson, Tim Maloney, Nick Morris, Richard Oliver, Dion Reneti, Troy Sachs, Stephen Trestrail ; Coach – Michael Tucker

1998 Gold CupFinished 4thTeam members – Troy Andrews, Sandy Blythe, Orfeo Cecconato, David Gould, Gerry Hewson, Tim Maloney, Mick McFawn, Campbell Message, Nick Morris, Brook Quinn, Troy Sachs, Steve Trestrail ; Coaches – Bob Turner (head coach), Richard Oliver (assistant coach)

2002 Gold CupFinished 2ndTeam members – Troy Andrews, Sandy Blythe, Brendan Dowler, Justin Eveson, David Gould, Shaun Groenewegen, Adrian King, Grant Mizens, Brad Ness, Troy Sachs, David Selby, Darryl Taylor ' Coaches – Murray Treseder (head coach), Alan Cox (assistant coach), Craig Friday (assistant coach)

2006 World ChampionshipsFinished 3rd 
 Team members – Justin Eveson, Brett Stibners, Tristan Knowles, Shaun Norris, Andrew Flavell, Darryl Taylor, Adrian King, Tige Simmons, Jace Claree, Shaun Groenewegen, Brendan Dowler, Brad Ness ; Coaches – Murray Treseder (head coach), Mal Keene (assistant coach) ; Officials – Kelvin Browner (manager), Ian Lowther (physiotherapist).

2010 World ChampionshipsFinished 1stTeam members -Justin Eveson (4.5), Bill Latham (4.0), Brett Stibners (4.0), Shaun Norris (3.0), Michael Hartnett (1.0), Tristan Knowles (4.0), John McPhail (1.0), Tige Simmons (1.0), Grant Mizens (2.0), Dylan Alcott (1.0), Jeremy Doyle (1.0), Brad Ness (4.5) ; Coaches – Ben Ettridge (head coach), Craig Friday (assistant coach), Tom Kyle (assistant coach) ; Officials – Leigh Gooding (manager), Jesse Adams (physiotherapist), Jo Vaile (Physiologist)

2014 World ChampionshipsFinished 1stTeam members – Joshua Allison, Jannik Blair, Adam Deans, Justin Eveson, Michael Hartnett, Tristan Knowles, Bill Latham, Brad Ness, Shaun Norris, Tom O'Neill-Thorne, Luke Pople, Nick Taylor; Coaches – Ben Ettridge (head coach), Craig Friday (assistant coach), Luke Brennan (assistant coach) ; Officials – Leigh Gooding (team manager), Jesse Adams (physiotherapist), Jo Vaile (Recover Specialist)

2018 World ChampionshipsFinished 3rdTeam members – Michael Auprince, Jannik Blair, Steven Elliott, Tristan Knowles, Bill Latham, Matthew McShane, Shaun Norris, Tom O'Neill-Thorne, Luke Pople, Kim Robbins, Brett Stibners, Sam White ; Coaches''' – Craig Friday (head coach), Brad Ness (assistant coach), Grant Mizens (Technical / Specialist Coach) ; Officials – Jesse Adams (physiotherapist), Peta Forsyth (Physiologist), Priyanka Karunakaran (team manager)

See also

Australia men's national basketball team
Australia women's national wheelchair basketball team

References

IPC Historical Results Database – General Search, International Paralympic Committee (IPC)
The information from the International Paralympic Committee (IPC) website is based on sources which does not present all information from earlier paralympic games (1960–1984), such as relay and team members. (Per 5 March 2011)
Paralympics – Results, International Wheelchair Basketball Federation (IWBF)

External links
Rollers, at Basketball Australia

National men's wheelchair basketball teams
Wheelchair basketball in Australia
Australian Paralympic teams